Laso may refer to:

People
 Francisco Laso,  Peruvian painter and politician
 Joaquín Laso,  Argentine professional footballer
 Maximiliano Laso,  Argentine footballer
 Pablo Laso, Spanish professional basketball head coach
 Ramón Laso,  Spanish serial killer

Other uses
 LASO, Los Angeles County Sheriff's Department, California, U.S.

See also 
 Læsø
 Lasso (disambiguation)